The Battle of Curapalihue (4 April 1817) fought in Chile, was a minor encounter between South American rebels and Spanish royalists, during the South American wars of independence. The result was a defeat for the royalists.

Background
After the defeat of Chacabuco and the capture of Santiago by the Army of the Andes, the royalist forces concentrated around Concepción under Colonel José Ordóñez. General José de San Martín ordered Colonel Juan Gregorio de Las Heras to take command of a division and move south. When Colonel Ordóñez heard of the approach of the patriot army, he decided to stage a surprise night attack against them.

The battle
The Spanish forces, under the command of  Lieutenant Colonel Juan José Campillo, were composed of 500 infantry and 100 cavalry. They attacked at 1:30 AM, but their surprise was foiled and they  had to retreat very soon leaving behind 10 soldiers dead and 7 prisoners, while the patriot forces suffered almost no casualties.

References

External links 
 Historia de Chile
 Chillán Viejo, Chile

Conflicts in 1817
Battles involving Chile
Battles involving Spain
Battles of the Spanish American wars of independence
Battles of the Chilean War of Independence
Battles of the Patria Nueva Campaign
1817 in the Captaincy General of Chile
April 1817 events